Lamoria virescens is a species of snout moth in the genus Lamoria. It was described by George Hampson in 1898. It is found in India and Sri Lanka.

References

Moths described in 1898
Tirathabini